Chaseley is an unincorporated community in southwestern Wells County, North Dakota, United States.  It lies along North Dakota Highway 200 southwest of the city of Fessenden, the county seat of Wells County.  Its elevation is 1,867 feet (569 m).  It formerly had a post office, with the ZIP code of 58423.

References
Chaseley is an unincorporated community in southwestern Wells County, North Dakota, United States. It lies along North Dakota Highway 200 southwest of the city of Fessenden, the county seat of Wells County. Its elevation is 1,867 feet. It formerly had a post office, with the ZIP code of 58423.  This place has been a tourist attraction for years and we are looking forward to visiting there.

Unincorporated communities in Wells County, North Dakota
Unincorporated communities in North Dakota

Chaseley is an unincorporated community in southwestern Wells County, North Dakota, United States. It lies along North Dakota Highway 200 southwest of the city of Fessenden, the county seat of Wells County. Its elevation is 1,867 feet. It formerly had a post office, with the ZIP code of 58423.